is a feminine Japanese given name.

Possible writings
百合果, "lily, fruit"
由里香, "reason, hometown, fragrance"
由利加, "reason, profit, addition"
友里花, "friend, hometown, flower"
友里加, "friend, hometown, addition"
友里香, "friend, hometown, fragrance"
友梨香, "friend, pear, fragrance"
祐里香, "to help, hometown, fragrance"
夕梨花, "evening, pear, flower"

The name can also be written in hiragana or katakana.

People
, Japanese musician
, Japanese paralympic cross-country skier and biathlete
, Japanese voice actress
, Japanese voice actress and singer
, Japanese fashion model and singer
, Japanese ski jumper
, Japanese voice actress
, Japanese hypnotist and tarento
, Japanese voice actress and singer
, Japanese long-distance runner
, Japanese voice actress
, Japanese bowling player
, Japanese tennis player
, Japanese curler

Fictional characters
, character from the anime Martian Successor Nadesico
, character from the Rival Schools video game series
, angry vampire from Aikatsu!
, from Rokujouma no Shinryakusha
Yurika, Otakuthon mascot

See also
 Yurîka or Yuriika refers to Eureka, a 2000 Japanese film directed by Shinji Aoyama

Japanese feminine given names